Leovigildo Júnior Reis Rodrigues (born 26 December 1995), commonly known as Juninho, is a Brazilian professional footballer who plays as a defender for Pafos FC.

Career
On 28 July 2020, after two years in Macedonia, Juninho joined Ukrainian Premier League side Zorya Luhansk on a two-year deal.

Career statistics

References

1995 births
Living people
Brazilian footballers
Sportspeople from Minas Gerais
Association football defenders
Brazilian expatriate footballers
Campeonato Brasileiro Série D players
Campeonato Brasileiro Série C players
Campeonato Pernambucano players
Macedonian First Football League players
Ukrainian Premier League players
Cypriot First Division players
Clube Atlético Metropolitano players
Tupi Football Club players
Salgueiro Atlético Clube players
FK Makedonija Gjorče Petrov players
FK Vardar players
FC Zorya Luhansk players
Pafos FC players
Expatriate footballers in North Macedonia
Expatriate footballers in Ukraine
Expatriate footballers in Cyprus
Brazilian expatriate sportspeople in North Macedonia
Brazilian expatriate sportspeople in Ukraine
Brazilian expatriate sportspeople in Cyprus